Scalpay (or Sgalpaigh na Hearadh; i.e. "Scalpay of Harris" to distinguish it from Scalpay off Skye) is an island in the Outer Hebrides of Scotland.

Toponym 
Mac an Tàilleir (2003) suggests the name derives from "ship island" from the Norse. However, Haswell-Smith states that the Old Norse name was Skalprøy, meaning "scallop island".

Geology and geography
The main settlement on the island is at the north, near the bridge, clustered around An Acairseid a Tuath (North Harbour).

Across the centre of the island is a band of  mylonite and protocataclasite associated with the Outer Hebrides Thrust Zone. Some restricted occurrences of amphibolite and ultramafic rocks are also present. A number of tholeiitic dykes of Tertiary age cross the island with a NW-SE alignment. Scalpay is largely free from superficial deposits apart from an area of peat in the northeast.

The island is peppered with small lochans. The largest of these is Loch an Duin (Loch of the Fort) which has a tiny island in it, with the remains of the fort still visible. Eilean Glas, a tiny peninsula on Scalpay's eastern shore, is home to the first lighthouse to be built in the Outer Hebrides.

In 1997, a bridge from Harris to Scalpay was built, replacing a ferry service.

History
In 1746, Charles Edward Stuart fled to Scalpay after his forces were defeated at the Battle of Culloden.

Scalpay is home to many Gaelic singers and psalm precentors. The island used to have more than 10 shops over 30 years ago but due to lack of people and work, the last shop closed in 2007. There also used to be a salmon factory, which was a major local employer from 2001 until its closure in 2005. In the spring of 2009, local newspapers reported that the factory was to reopen as a net washing facility to support the local fish farming industry. In 2012, the Scalpay community bought and opened a community shop/café, Buth Scalpaigh.

Photographer Marco Secchi lived on Scalpay for few years between 2002-2008 and documented life and landscape of the Outer Hebrides.

In 2011 the island's owner, Fred Taylor, announced that he proposed handing over the land to the local population. One proposal was that the island would be owned by a local development trust; under another proposal it would form part of the larger North Harris Trust, itself community owned. Islanders voted to accept the gift and assume community ownership of the island. They will go into partnership with the North Harris Community Trust to run the island.

Demographics
In 2001, the island had 322 people, whose main employment was fish farming and prawn fishing. By 2011 the population had declined by 9% to 291 whilst during the same period Scottish island populations as a whole grew by 4% to 103,702.

The vast majority of the locals in Scalpay are Protestants. The island is home to two Presbyterian churches, the Free Church of Scotland and the Free Church of Scotland (Continuing).

See also

 List of islands of Scotland
 Ailein Duinn

Footnotes

Islands off Lewis and Harris
Harris, Outer Hebrides